A chamber tomb is a tomb for burial used in many different cultures. In the case of individual burials, the chamber is thought to signify a higher status for the interred than a simple grave. Built from rock or sometimes wood, the chambers could also serve as places for storage of the dead from one family or social group and were often used over long periods for multiple burials.

Most the chamber tombs were constructed from large stones or megaliths and covered by cairns, barrows or earth. Some chamber tombs are rock-cut monuments or wooden-chambered tombs covered with earth barrows. Grave goods are a common characteristic of chamber tomb burials.

In Neolithic and Bronze Age Europe, stone-built examples of these burials are known by the generic term of megalithic tombs. Chamber tombs are often distinguished by the layout of their chambers and entrances or the shape and material of the structure that covered them, either an earth barrow or stone cairn. A wide variety of local types has been identified, and some designs appear to have influenced others.

Types and examples

General terms:
Chambered cairn
Chambered long barrow
Cromlechs, dolmens and Hunebedden
Simple dolmen
Great dolmen
Polygonal dolmen
Rectangular dolmen
Corbelled tomb
Chamber tumulus
Gallery grave including:
Allées couvertes
Court cairn
Giants' grave
Naveta
the Peak District tomb group
Severn-Cotswold or Cotswold-Severn tomb
Transepted gallery grave
Wedge-shaped gallery grave
Entrance grave such as
Portal dolmen
Scillonian entrance grave
Passage grave including:
The tholos tombs of Mycenaean Greece.
Mycenaean chamber tomb
V-shaped passage grave
Cruciform passage grave
Clava cairn
Other types:
Domus de Janas
Dysser
Medway tomb
Shaft and chamber tomb

See also
Tomb of Two Brothers

Bibliography 

Megalithic monuments
European archaeology
Burial monuments and structures